Lenskart is an Indian multinational optical prescription eyewear retail chain, based in Faridabad.  Lenskart has 1,000 stores across 223 cities in India. Its manufacturing facility in New Delhi manufactures 3 lakh glasses a month.

Lenskart is building an automated factory in Bhiwadi, Rajasthan, with a production capacity of 5 crore glasses annually.

History 
Peyush Bansal, a former Microsoft employee, founded Lenskart.com in 2010 along with Amit Chaudhary and Sumeet Kapahi. In 2011, IDG Ventures India invested $4 million in the company and mandated it to also sell wristwatches, bags and jewellery online to replicate Titan Company's business. In 2011, the company launched Watchkart.com and Bagskart.com, and the following year, it started Jewelskart.com. By the end of 2014, only Lenskart.com remained operative as the company shut down its other three websites.

In January 2015, the company raised 135 crore from TPG Growth, TR Capital and IDG Ventures India. In 2016, International Finance Corporation, Adveq Management, TPG Growth and IDG Ventures India invested a total of $60 million in Lenskart. The company also saw investments from Ratan Tata and Kris Gopalakrishnan.

Lenskart launched the eyewear brand John Jacobs in 2017.  In October 2017, Lenskart signed up its first brand ambassador Katrina Kaif.

In March 2018, Wipro’s Chairman Azim Premji invested ₹4 crore in the group, taking the valuation of the company to ₹3,000 crore. In 2018, the company became profitable, EBITDA positive.  In March 2019, the company hired Bhuvan Bam as its first male brand ambassador. The company reached a valuation of $1 billion in December 2019 after SoftBank invested around $275 million.

In June 2022, Lenskart announced the acquisition of a majority stake in the Japanese eyewear brand Owndays in a cash-and-stock deal which valued Owndays at around 400 million.

References

External links

2010 establishments in Delhi
Eyewear companies of India
Eyewear brands of India